Nidularium innocentii var. striatum is a plant in the genus Nidularium. This plant is endemic to Brazil.

Cultivars
 Nidularium 'Francois Spae'

References

BSI Cultivar Registry Retrieved 11 October 2009

innocentii var. striatum
Flora of Brazil